Zielona may refer to the following places:
Zielona, Lublin Voivodeship (east Poland)
Zielona, Gmina Gródek in Podlaskie Voivodeship (northeast Poland)
Zielona, Gmina Supraśl in Podlaskie Voivodeship (northeast Poland)
Zielona, Bochnia County in Lesser Poland Voivodeship (south Poland)
Zielona, Proszowice County in Lesser Poland Voivodeship (south Poland)
Zielona, Ciechanów County in Masovian Voivodeship (east central Poland)
Zielona, Przasnysz County in Masovian Voivodeship (east central Poland)
Zielona, Żuromin County in Masovian Voivodeship (east central Poland)
Zielona, Greater Poland Voivodeship (west central Poland)
Zelena, a village in Nadvirna Raion in Ivano-Frankivsk Oblast in western Ukraine, which was part of Poland between the first and second world wars

 other
 Zielona (genus), an insect genus in the tribe Dikraneurini